Taiga is a 1958 West German drama film directed by Wolfgang Liebeneiner and starring Ruth Leuwerik, Hannes Messemer and Günter Pfitzmann.

It was shot at the Bavaria Studios in Munich. The film's sets were designed by the art directors Robert Herlth and Gottfried Will. The title refers to the taiga that covers much of Siberia.

Synopsis
After the Second World War a female Doctor tends to the German prisoners held in a camp in Siberia.

Cast

References

Bibliography 
 Frey, Mattias. Postwall German Cinema: History, Film History and Cinephilia. Berghahn Books, 2013.

External links 
 

1958 films
West German films
German drama films
1958 drama films
1950s German-language films
Films directed by Wolfgang Liebeneiner
Eastern Front of World War II films
World War II prisoner of war films
Bavaria Film films
Films shot at Bavaria Studios
1950s German films